Milena Magdalena Olszewska (born 21 May 1984) is a Polish Paralympic archer.

She has won two Paralympic bronze medals.

Biography
Milena Olszewska was born with underdevelopment of her right leg, and at the age of 15 the leg was amputated. She completed her pedagogical studies at the State Higher Vocational School in Gorzow Wielkopolski and was employed in the office of the Gorzów Disability Sport "Start".

In 2007 she began training in archery, trained by Alicja Bukańska and coached by Ryszard Bukański. In 2009 she debuted at the World Para-Archery Championships, occupying 5th place in the team. In 2012 she made her debut at the Summer Paralympics in London, winning a bronze medal in the individual standing competition.

In 2013 she won the world championship in the slalom (with Piotr Sawicki), in the same competition she took third place individually. In 2013, she was ranked as the world's first disabled archer.  In 2014 and 2016 she won the European Championship, in the same event she occupied second and third place respectively in the individual tournament. In 2016, at the Summer Paralympics in Rio de Janeiro, Milena won an individual bronze medal in the recurve (in open play this time).

She was decorated with Brown (2013) and Silver (2016) Cross of Merit (2013).

References

Paralympic archers of Poland
Archers at the 2012 Summer Paralympics
Archers at the 2016 Summer Paralympics
Paralympic bronze medalists for Poland
Living people
Polish female archers
1984 births
People from Czarnków
Medalists at the 2012 Summer Paralympics
Medalists at the 2016 Summer Paralympics
Paralympic medalists in archery